Jordan Ross (born 25 October 1984) is an English former professional rugby league footballer who played in the 2000s and 2010s.

Playing career
In 2010, he helped York City Knights earn promotion to the Championship, playing in the 25–4 victory against Oldham in the Championship One Grand Final. He left the club at the end of the season and moved to Australia.

International honours
Jordan Ross won caps for Wales while at York City Knights in 2010.

References

1984 births
Living people
English rugby league players
Keighley Cougars players
Rochdale Hornets players
Rugby league players from Keighley
Rugby league second-rows
Wales national rugby league team players
York City Knights players